Hong Konger Front is a bilingual website founded in 2004 to advocate Hong Kong's gaining independence from China and building the Republic of Hong Kong. The website was covered by media conveying condemnation from both China and Hong Kong's pro-Beijing politicians.

In the beginning, its call for Hong Kong independence was not echoed by Hong Kong's localist groups, not to mention moderate democrats who preferred waiting for One country, two systems and universal suffrage, both promised by Beijing years before the 1997 Handover of Hong Kong and enshrined in the Basic Law (constitution) of Hong Kong.

Unlike the other Hong Kong pro-independence groups, Hong Konger Front goes further to support the separation of Inner Mongolia, Taiwan, Tibet, Xinjiang, and China's southern, eastern and northeast provinces from the People's Republic of China, as shown in a map on its website.

See also 
 Hong Kong Basic Law Article 45

References

External links 
 Hong Konger Front website

Hong Kong websites
Hong Kong independence movement